

References

Populated places in Chitral District